Tsaraphycis is a genus of snout moths. It was described by Viette in 1970.

Species
Tsaraphycis libanoticella (Zerny, 1934)
Tsaraphycis mimeticella (Staudinger, 1879)
Tsaraphycis safedella (Amsel, 1970)

References

Phycitinae
Pyralidae genera